Hymenophyllum bivalve is a species of filmy fern. Found in moist sheltered areas, in or near mountain rainforests in Australia and New Zealand. The habitat is on tree trunks, rocks and fallen logs.

References

bivalve
Epiphytes
Flora of New South Wales
Flora of Queensland
Flora of New Zealand